Filippoi (Greek: , Philippi), is a village and a former municipality in the Kavala regional unit, East Macedonia and Thrace, Greece. Since the 2011 local government reform it is part of the municipality Kavala, of which it is a municipal unit. The municipal unit has an area of 238.751 km2. The 2011 census reported a population of 11,711 for the municipal unit and 894 for the village. The ruins of ancient Philippi are located in the municipal unit.

The most important cultural event of the town is its annual festival, held since 1957.  It takes place in the Ancient Theatre of Philippi during the high season with ancient and modern performances, ballets and concerts by theatrical troupes, orchestras and bands.

This ancient Greek theatre dates to 357 B.C. It was first restored in 1957 by Dimitris Lazaridis with a view of holding the festival.

Twin cities
 Čačak, Serbia

References

Populated places in Kavala (regional unit)

el:Δήμος Καβάλας#Δημοτική ενότητα Φιλίππων